This article features a list of islands sorted by their name beginning with the letter R.

R

R